King George School may refer to:

King George Secondary School, a secondary school in Vancouver, British Columbia, Canada
King George School (Calgary, Alberta), an elementary school in Calgary, Alberta
King George V School (Hong Kong), a secondary school in Hong Kong
King George School (Sutton, Vermont), a secondary school in Sutton, Vermont
King George High School, a high school in King George, Virginia
King George School (Saskatoon), an elementary school in Saskatoon, Saskatchewan